Satoru Yasuda (born 27 July 1975) is a Japanese pole vaulter.
  
His personal best jump is 5.50 metres, achieved in May 2000 in Gifu.

International competitions

References

1975 births
Living people
Japanese male pole vaulters
Asian Games silver medalists for Japan
Asian Games medalists in athletics (track and field)
Athletes (track and field) at the 2002 Asian Games
Medalists at the 2002 Asian Games
Japan Championships in Athletics winners